The "Vileyka" VLF transmitter is the site of the 43rd Communications Center of the Russian Navy, located west of the town of Vileyka in Belarus. The "Vileyka" VLF transmitter is an important facility for transmitting orders to submarines in the very low frequency range. Beside this, it is used for transmitting the time signal RJH69 at certain times.

In common with the former Goliath transmitter of the Kriegsmarine  in World War II, the antenna system of the "Vileyka" VLF transmitter consists of three antenna systems with a central mast insulated against ground from which antenna wires run to six grounded ring masts, where they are fixed by insulators. As at former Goliath transmitter, three ring masts carry two antenna systems, so there are only 15 ring masts on the site.
A further common ground to former Goliath transmitter is, that the ring masts of the Goliath transmitter are masts of lattice steel with triangular cross section, while the central masts are steel tube masts.

External links 
 http://englishrussia.com/?p=1207#more-1207

Military radio systems
Radio masts and towers in Europe
Russian and Soviet Navy bases
Buildings and structures in Minsk Region
Military electronics of Russia
Communications in the Soviet Union
Military installations of Russia in other countries
Towers in Belarus